The Salta Open, or the Abierto de Salta, was a golf tournament on the TPG Tour, the official professional golf tour in Argentina. Played from 2004 to 2008, it was always held at the Salta Golf & Polo Club, in Salta, Salta Province.

Winners

External links
TPG Tour – official site

Golf tournaments in Argentina